Elachyophtalma meeki is a moth in the family Bombycidae. It was described by Walter Rothschild in 1920. It is found on New Guinea.

The wingspan is about 48 mm. The forewings are semi-vitreous pale golden yellow, the apical one-third densely sprinkled with grey scales. The hindwings are semi-vitreous pale golden yellow.

References

Bombycidae
Taxa named by Walter Rothschild
Moths described in 1920